The Lidice Memorial is a monument to the Lidice massacre perpetrated by Nazi Germany in the Protectorate of Bohemia and Moravia during the Second World War.

The memorial was added to the National Register of Historic Places in 2006.

History
The Lidice Memorial serves as a tribute to the village of Lidice in Czechoslovakia. In 1942, the village was destroyed and nearly all of its citizens were killed or dispersed by the Ordnungspolizei of Nazi Germany in response to Operation Anthropoid, the assassination of Reinhard Heydrich. The monument, located in Sokol Park in the town of Phillips, Wisconsin, was erected in 1944.

References

External links
 Memorial in Lidice, Czechia

Czech-American culture in Wisconsin
Slovak-American history
Monuments and memorials on the National Register of Historic Places in Wisconsin
World War II memorials in the United States
Art Deco architecture in Wisconsin
Buildings and structures in Price County, Wisconsin
National Register of Historic Places in Price County, Wisconsin